The Governor's Land Archeological District encompasses an area upstream from Jamestown, Virginia (now in James County) that was historically reserved for the use of the Virginia Colony's royal governor. The territory includes a settlement established in 1617 called Argall's Settlement.

The district was listed on the National Register of Historic Places in 1973.

See also
National Register of Historic Places listings in James City County, Virginia

References

James City County, Virginia
Historic districts on the National Register of Historic Places in Virginia
National Register of Historic Places in James City County, Virginia